.hn is the Internet country code top-level domain (ccTLD) for Honduras.

Second-level domain names
 .net.hn
 .org.hn
 .edu.hn
 .gob.hn
 .com.hn

See also
Internet in Honduras

References

External links
 IANA .hn whois information

Computer-related introductions in 1993
Country code top-level domains
Communications in Honduras

sv:Toppdomän#H